"It's Up to You" is a song written by Jerry Fuller and performed by Rick Nelson. The song reached #4 on the adult contemporary chart, #6 on the Billboard Hot 100, #22 in the UK, and #24 on the R&B chart in 1963.  The single's B-side, "I Need You", reached #83 on the Billboard Hot 100.  The song is featured on his 1962 album, It's Up to You.

References

1962 songs
1962 singles
Songs written by Jerry Fuller
Ricky Nelson songs
Billy J. Kramer songs
Imperial Records singles